The women's 4×100 metre freestyle relay was a swimming event held as part of the swimming at the 1932 Summer Olympics programme. It was the fifth appearance of the event, which was established in 1912. The competition was held on Friday, August 12, 1932.

Twenty swimmers from five nations competed.

Medalists

Records
These were the standing world and Olympic records (in minutes) prior to the 1928 Summer Olympics.

The United States set a new world record with 4:38.0 minutes.

Results

As there were only five nation who competed in this event only a final was held.

Final

References

External links
Olympic Report
 

Swimming at the 1932 Summer Olympics
1932 in women's swimming
Women's events at the 1932 Summer Olympics